Paracles albescens is a moth of the subfamily Arctiinae first described by George Hampson in 1901. It is found in Venezuela and Peru.

References

Moths described in 1901
Paracles